Czuczman is the name of several people:

Kevin Czuczman (born 1991), Canadian professional ice hockey defenceman
Mike Czuczman (born 1953), English professional footballer